Horace or Horrie Miller may refer to:

 Horrie Miller (aviator) (1893–1980), Australian aviation pioneer
 Horrie Miller (rugby league) (1882–1967), Australian rugby league footballer and administrator
 Horace Miller (cricketer) (born 1989), Jamaican cricketer
 Horace Miller, fictional character in the musical, Miss Liberty
 Horace Miller, American football player in the 2014 Carolina Panthers season
 Horace A. Miller, part owner of the original Pacific Gas and Electric Company
 Horace H. Miller, United States Ambassador to Bolivia in the 1850s